
Olga Tereshkova (née Tsykunova; born 26 October 1984) is a Kazakhstani former sprinter who specialized in the 400 metres.

At the age of 16, she just missed out on a medal in the 400 m at the 2001 World Youth Championships in Athletics. Following this she made a number of appearances with the 4 x 400 metres relay team, taking silver at the 2002 Asian Games. She made her first appearance on the senior world stage when she took part in the 4 x 400 relay race at the 2003 World Championships in Athletics. She won further silver relay medals at the 2005 Asian Athletics Championships and the 2006 Asian Games. She also made her first impact in the individual senior events at the Asian Games, beating Manjit Kaur to the gold in the 400 m.

She set her personal best time of 51.62 seconds at the 2007 Universiade in Bangkok. She was knocked out in the heats at the 2007 World Championships in Athletics, but she had regional success soon after, taking bronze at the 2007 Asian Indoor Games. She also won gold with the women's Kazakhstan relay team, setting an Asian Indoor Games record in the process.

She represented her country in the 400 metres race at the 2008 Beijing Olympics, but she was again knocked out at the heats stage. Tereshkova competed at the 2009 Asian Indoor Games and reached the 400 m final but did not manage to win a medal.

Doping
At the 2011 Asian Athletics Championships she won the 400 m title and the relay silver with the Kazakhstan women's team. However, she lost these medals as her drug test at the competition came back positive for excess testosterone. She received a two-year ban from the sport beginning from July 2011. On 19 March 2014 she again tested positive for an illegal substance, Methyltestosterone, and received a lifetime ban.

Achievements

See also
List of doping cases in athletics

References

1984 births
Living people
Kazakhstani female sprinters
Olympic athletes of Kazakhstan
Athletes (track and field) at the 2008 Summer Olympics
Asian Games medalists in athletics (track and field)
Athletes (track and field) at the 2002 Asian Games
Athletes (track and field) at the 2006 Asian Games
Athletes (track and field) at the 2010 Asian Games
World Athletics Championships athletes for Kazakhstan
Doping cases in athletics
Kazakhstani sportspeople in doping cases
Universiade medalists in athletics (track and field)
Asian Games gold medalists for Kazakhstan
Asian Games silver medalists for Kazakhstan
Medalists at the 2002 Asian Games
Medalists at the 2006 Asian Games
Medalists at the 2010 Asian Games
Universiade gold medalists for Kazakhstan
Competitors at the 2011 Summer Universiade
Competitors at the 2005 Summer Universiade
Medalists at the 2007 Summer Universiade
Olympic female sprinters
20th-century Kazakhstani women
21st-century Kazakhstani women